Robarts or Robartes may refer to:

Surnames

Charles Robartes (1660–1723), Second Earl of Radnor
Gerald Robarts (1878–1961), British soldier and squash rackets player
John Robartes, 1st Earl of Radnor (1606–1685), succeeded his father, Richard, as Baron Robartes
John Robarts (1917–1982), Canadian politician
John Robarts (Baháʼí) (1901–1991), Canadian Baháʼí, a Hand of the Cause of God
John Robarts (VC) (1818–1888), English recipient of the Victoria Cross
Richard Robarts (born 1944), English Formula One driver
Robert Robartes (1634–1682), Viscount Bodmin
Thomas Agar-Robartes, 6th Viscount Clifden (1844-1930) known as Lord Robartes from 1882 to 1899

Other uses
Baron Robartes, a British hereditary peerage first created on 1625 for Richard Robartes
Robarts Library, the main humanities and social sciences library of the University of Toronto
Robarts Research Institute, a non-profit medical research facility in London, Ontario with a staff of nearly 600 people

See also
Michael Robartes and the Dancer, a 1921 book of poems by William Butler Yeats
Robards (disambiguation)
Robert (disambiguation)
Roberts (disambiguation)
Robertson (disambiguation)